First Church of Christ, Scientist  is the main congregation for Atlanta, Georgia’s Christian Science community.  Its historic Greek revival church edifice is located on the corner of Fifteenth Street, N.E., and Peachtree Street in the city's Midtown section and is a contributing property in the Ansley Park Historic District.

The church was opened in 1914, replacing a smaller church building at 17 West Baker Street, where services were held since 1899. The church's architect, Arthur Neal Robinson with Edward Emmett Dougherty's firm, was also a congregant. The church claims to be the first air-conditioned building in Atlanta, having used a primitive system of involving fans blowing over blocks of ice placed in the passages beneath the floor of the main auditorium.

See also
 Sue Harper Mims
 First Church of Christ, Scientist (disambiguation)

References

External links

Official web site
Review of the church’s architecture
 Architecture Tourist: First Church of Christ, Scientist, Atlanta 

Churches in Atlanta
Christian Science churches in the United States
1914 establishments in Georgia (U.S. state)
Churches completed in 1914